Anne Nyokabi Muhoho (also called Hannah) (1920–August 2006) was married to Chief Muhoho in Kenya, and the mother-in-law of Jomo Kenyatta, the first prime minister (1963–1964) and the first president of Kenya (1964–1978). A girls' school in Nairobi bears her name.

Families
Her daughter Ngina Kenyatta (born 1931) was the first lady to late president Jomo Kenyatta. Anne Nyokabi Muhoho's son George Muhoho has been a Catholic priest, the first black African diplomat to the Vatican embassy attaché for the EU in Brussels.

She had two grandsons by Ngina, and Uhuru Kenyatta was elected the fourth president of Kenya in 2013,

After her husband died, she became a successful businessperson. In latter stage of her life, she lived on her family farm until her death in August 2006 near Nairobi.

See also
George Muhoho
Ngina Kenyatta

References

1920 births
2006 deaths
20th-century Kenyan businesswomen
20th-century Kenyan businesspeople